Anastasia Vyacheslavovna Pustovoitova (born 10 February 1981) is a Russian association football referee. Previously, she was a Russian women's international footballer who played as a defender.

Playing career 
Pustovoitova was a member of the Russia women's national football team and the club Ryazan as a defender. She was part of the team at the 2003 FIFA Women's World Cup.

Refereeing career 
Pustovoitova became a FIFA listed referee in 2009. She was appointed to be an official at the UEFA Women's Euro 2017 in the Netherlands.

On 3 December 2018, it was announced that Pustovoitova had been appointed to be a referee for the 2019 FIFA Women's World Cup in France. After the conclusion of the round of 16, FIFA announced that Pustovoitova was selected as one of 11 referees who would be assigned to the final phases of the tournament.

In April 2019, she was featured on the YouTube channel "Krasava", which is run by former footballer Yevgeny Savin.

In May 2019, Pustovoitova was appointed to officiate the 2019 UEFA Women's Champions League Final between Olympique Lyonnais and FC Barcelona in Budapest.

In August 2021, Pustovoitova was appointed to the Sweden-Canada gold medal match at the COVID-delayed 2020 Summer Olympics.

References

External links 
 
 
 

1981 births
Living people
People from Jeseník
Russian women's footballers
Russia women's international footballers
Place of birth missing (living people)
2003 FIFA Women's World Cup players
Women's association football defenders
Russian football referees
Women association football referees
FIFA Women's World Cup referees
Ryazan-VDV players